Top is the second studio album by American rapper YoungBoy Never Broke Again. It was released on September 11, 2020, through Never Broke Again and Atlantic Records. It follows his debut album, Until Death Call My Name, released over two years before. It is YoungBoy's third project of 2020, following the mixtapes, 38 Baby 2 and Still Flexin, Still Steppin. Top consists of 21 tracks and includes guest appearances from Snoop Dogg and Lil Wayne.

Background
Following the release of 38 Baby and after releasing music continuously for four years, YoungBoy announced that he would take a brief hiatus from releasing new music. At the time, he tweeted, "After Friday [38 Baby 2s release], I'll never release a song/album again until I'm in a better situation". He also publicly asked his label for his master's degree in exchange for four new albums. However, the label declined this offer. The album was announced by YoungBoy on August 20 through his social media, along with the date, and indicated the project would consist of 18 tracks. By August 25, the album reached number one on Apple Music based on pre-orders alone.

Singles
"All In" was released as the album's lead single on August 2, 2020. On it, YoungBoy deals with heartbreak and loss over a guitar-tinged production. "Kacey Talk" was released as the second single and features ad-libs from YoungBoy's son Kacey. He also appears in the video along with one of his brother's Kayden
. The album's third single, "Callin", features Snoop Dogg and was released on September 1, 2020. A "minimal and smooth" track, it showcases YoungBoy's signature aggressive "punch and high energy".

Other songs
The song, called "Sticks with Me" was released on June 12, 2020, prior to the album's announcement, along with a Rich Porter-directed video, of which shows YoungBoy in one scene performing in and around a casket and gravesite.

The song, called "Murder Business" was released as a single on August 25, 2020, also directed by Rich Porter; the video sees YoungBoy and his crew in various locations.

The song, called "House Arrest Tingz" appears on track 18 from the album. It was originally released exclusively on YouTube on September 25, 2019, while YoungBoy was on house arrest.

The song, called "The Last Backyard..." is a song that leaked in early 2020, following a live performance of it. It is included as the album's third track.

Cover art
The album cover was revealed along with the album's announcement. It immediately drew criticism for its similarities to that of Atlantic Records labelmate Roddy Ricch's Please Excuse Me for Being Antisocial (2019). Both covers are shot in black and white and features similar poses and clothing. Zoe Johnson of XXL noted: "NBA YoungBoy, however, is wearing two iced-out Cuban link choker chains, which sit on the neckline of his shirt while Roddy's jewelry is tucked inside of his shirt". Ricch responded in now-deleted tweets, writing, "It's only ONE roddy". He also downplayed any issues between him and YoungBoy: "And I been good wit dude so don't make it about him... I'm just tired of all this comparing stuff".

Critical reception

Top received generally positive reviews from music critics. Fred Thomas from AllMusic stated that YoungBoy has reached a new level of "versatility and expression." He further states that "the material is some of his strongest, managing commercial accessibility while giving a more authentic view of his personality than anything he's done before." Okla Jones from Consequence of Sound stated that "YoungBoy Never Broke Again will undoubtedly garner more notoriety following the release of Top," however, she also mentions that "YoungBoy’s biggest flaw is sometimes not having much new to say." She concludes her review by adding "While this overall body of work may leave many things to be desired from an artistic standpoint, it also gives voice to an entire community of Southern youth."

Josh Svetz from HipHopDX states that "the raps offer up the pristine voyeuristic escapism into the neighborhoods white suburbanites wouldn’t be caught dead setting foot in." He also mentions that "YoungBoy’s songwriting makes mainstream rap feel dangerous again." Finalizing his review, he declares that "Top reinforces that no matter how famous YoungBoy gets – he’ll always keep it real, something we rarely see in today’s world."

Commercial performance
Top debuted at number one on the US Billboard 200 with 126,000 album-equivalent units (including 19,000 pure album sales) in its first week, becoming YoungBoy's third number-one album overall, as well as his second number-one album in 2020. It also accumulated a total of 156.32 million on-demand US streams from all its tracks, in the week ending September 26, 2020.

Track listing

Charts

Weekly charts

Year-end charts

Certifications

References

2020 albums
YoungBoy Never Broke Again albums
Atlantic Records albums
Albums produced by JetsonMade